Things from Another World is a 2011 Italian comedy film directed by Francesco Patierno, loosely based on A Day Without a Mexican.

Cast
 Diego Abatantuono as Mariso Golfetto
 Laura Efrikian as Ariele's mother
 Valentina Lodovini as Laura
 Valerio Mastandrea as Ariele Verderame
 Paola Rivetta as herself
 Roberta Sparta as Truccatrice
 Vitaliano Trevisan as Tassista

See also
 Films about immigration to Italy

References

External links
 

2011 films
2011 comedy films
Italian comedy films
2010s Italian-language films
Films about immigration
2010s Italian films